A scapegoat is a goat used in a religious ritual or the victim of scapegoating, the singling out of a party for unmerited blame.

Scapegoat or The Scapegoat may also refer to:

Places
 Scapegoat Wilderness, a Wilderness Area in Montana
 Scapegoat Mountain, a mountain in the Scapegoat Wilderness

Literature
 The Scapegoat, translated work by Arvid Paulson from August Strindberg's Syndabocken
 "The Scapegoat", a study of collective violence by René Girard
 The Scapegoat (Du Maurier novel), a 1957 novel by Daphne du Maurier
 Scapegoat, an investigation into the trial of Richard Hauptmann
 Scapegoat: The Jews, Israel, and Women's Liberation, a 2000 book by Andrea Dworkin
 "The Scapegoat" (Cherryh novel), a 1985 novella by science fiction writer C. J. Cherryh
 The Scapegoat, a novel by Hall Caine

Film, television and radio
 The Scapegoat (1912 film), an American short film starring Tom Mix, directed by Otis B. Thayer
 The Scapegoat (1914 film), an American short film starring Tom Mix, directed by Tom Mix
 The Scapegoat (1917 film), a Frederick Douglass Film Company production based on a story by Paul Laurence Dunbar
 The Scapegoat (1959 film), an adaptation of the du Maurier novel, starring Alec Guinness and Bette Davis
 The Scapegoat (2009), a film by BBC Northern Ireland about the murder of Patricia Curran, daughter of Lancelot Curran, in 1952
 The Scapegoat (2011 film), a Turkish film
 The Scapegoat (2012 film), a British remake of the du Maurier novel
 The Scapegoat (2013 film), a French film
 The Scapegoat (audio drama), a Doctor Who audio drama

Music
 Scapegoat (band), an American rock group

Albums
 Scapegoat (album), by Takuto, 2017
 Scapegoat, by Josh Abbott Band, 2008

Songs
 "Scapegoat" (song), by D'banj, 2010
 "Scapegoat", by Atmosphere from Overcast!, 1997
 "Scapegoat", by Chumbawamba from Tubthumper, 1997
 "Scapegoat", by Downthesun from Downthesun, 2002
 "Scapegoat", by Fad Gadget from Under the Flag, 1982
 "Scapegoat", by Fear Factory from Soul of a New Machine, 1992
 "Scapegoat", by Guano Apes from Proud Like a God, 1997
 "Scapegoat", by Sevendust from Chapter VII: Hope & Sorrow
 "Scapegoats", by Christy Moore from Smoke & Strong Whiskey, 1991
 "Scapegoats", by Baby Keem from The Melodic Blue, 2021

Other uses
 The Scapegoat (painting), by William Holman Hunt
 SS-14 Scapegoat, a Soviet ballistic missile
 Scapegoat tree, a binary search tree used in computer science